Abdoulaye Naby Camara (born 1 January 1994) is a Guinean professional footballer who plays as a defender for Guinée Championnat National club CI Kamsar and the Guinea national team.

References

External links 

 

 
 

1994 births
Living people
Guinean footballers
Association football defenders
ASFAG players
CI Kamsar players
Guinée Championnat National players
Guinea international footballers
Guinea A' international footballers
2018 African Nations Championship players
2020 African Nations Championship players